Katt is a village in Shaheed Bhagat Singh Nagar district of Punjab State, India. The village is administrated by Sarpanch an elected representative of the village.

Demography 
As of 2011, Katt has a total number of 213 houses and population of 1029 of which 530 include are males while 499 are females according to the report published by Census India in 2011. The literacy rate of Katt is 82.47% higher than the state average of 75.84%. The population of children under the age of 6 years is 99 which is 9.62% of total population of Katt, and child sex ratio is approximately 1020 as compared to Punjab state average of 846.

Most of the people are from Schedule Caste which constitutes 38.87% of total population in Katt. The town does not have any Schedule Tribe population so far.

As per the report published by Census India in 2011, 309 people were engaged in work activities out of the total population of Katt which includes 382 males and 27 females. According to census survey report 2011, 88.67% workers describe their work as main work and 11.33% workers are involved in Marginal activity providing livelihood for less than 6 months.

Education 
The village has a Punjabi medium, co-ed upper primary school established in 2001. The school provide mid-day meal as per Indian Midday Meal Scheme. As per Right of Children to Free and Compulsory Education Act the school provide free education to children between the ages of 6 and 14. The village also has an privet un-aided Punjabi medium, co-ed primary with upper primary school established in 2003.

Amardeep Singh Shergill Memorial college Mukandpur and Sikh National College Banga are the nearest colleges.

Transport 

See also 
List of villages in India

References

External links 
 Tourism of Punjab
 Census of Punjab
 Locality Based PINCode

Villages in Shaheed Bhagat Singh Nagar district